William Rafferty (June 17, 1944 – August 11, 2012) was an American comedian and impressionist who hosted the game shows Every Second Counts (1984–1985, syndicated), Card Sharks (1986–87, syndication), and Blockbusters (1987, NBC).

Early life 
Rafferty was born in Queens, New York. He was the fourth and youngest child of Henry Rafferty, Sr., and Martha (Degnan) Rafferty.

Career 
Before his career in television, Rafferty was a military policeman in the United States Army. He was also a butcher in Bolinas, California.

His first national TV exposure was as a co-host on the NBC reality series Real People, which ran from 1979 to 1984. Originally, he was one of the five in-studio co-hosts before becoming a field correspondent ("roving reporter"), though he still made occasional studio appearances.

Rafferty also made guest appearances on episodes of Laugh-In in the late 1970s version of the show. Rafferty was the host of a television show on Retirement Living TV, called Retired and Wired, which debuted in October 2007.

Personal life
Rafferty married Regina Miletic on May 25, 1968, in Queens, New York. Rafferty died from congestive heart failure on the morning of August 11, 2012.

Filmography

Film

Television

References

External links

1944 births
2012 deaths
American male comedians
American game show hosts
People from Queens, New York
People from San Rafael, California
Comedians from California
Comedians from New York (state)